Pasqualino Borsellino (born 29 January 1956 in Ribera, Sicily) is an Italian football manager and former player who played as a midfielder for several teams, including Palermo.

References

External links
Profile at Carrierecalciatori.it

1956 births
Living people
People from Ribera, Agrigento
Footballers from Sicily
Italian footballers
Palermo F.C. players
Ternana Calcio players
S.S. Monopoli 1966 players
Association football midfielders
Serie B players
Italian football managers
Sportspeople from the Province of Agrigento